The Inglis Bridge, Monmouth, Wales crosses the River Monnow linking Vauxhall Fields and the suburb of  Osbaston. Designed by, and named after, Charles Inglis, the bridge was constructed in 1931 and refurbished in 1988. It is a Mark II model of an Inglis bridge, and the only known example in Britain of such a bridge still in public use. Access is now limited to pedestrians, vehicular use being prohibited in 2018 on safety grounds. The bridge is a Grade II listed structure.

History
Sir Charles Inglis (31 July 1875 – 19 April 1952) was a British civil engineer. While a lecturer in mechanical engineering at King's College, Cambridge, Inglis joined the Cambridge University Officers' Training Corps and on the outbreak of World War 1 was commissioned into the Royal Engineers. Appointed director of the bridging department, he designed a transportable steel bridge that could be erected in a day. Named the Inglis bridge in his honour, the design remained in use by the British Army throughout the First World War and the inter-war period, until being superseded by the higher capacity Bailey bridge in 1940–1941.

The Inglis Bridge at Monmouth was built by the Royal Monmouthshire Royal Engineers (RMRE) in 1931. The regiment was, and is, based at Monmouth Castle, and the bridge provided access to its training ground on Vauxhall Fields. The regiment undertook the refurbishment of the bridge in 1988. The bridge was closed to vehicles in 2011 on safety grounds, although it was reopened shortly afterwards in the face of local opposition. The bridge was again closed to vehicles in 2018 amid arguments over the responsibility for the funding of repairs. It remains the only known example of such a bridge in the UK in public use.

Location
Vauxhall Fields was developed as a pleasure ground in the 18th century by John Tibbs, landlord of the Beaufort Arms Hotel. In the 1850s, the headquarters of the RMRE were established at Monmouth Castle, and a training camp was developed on Vauxhall Fields in the early 20th century. In 1905, access over the River Monnow to the camp was facilitated by the construction of a wooden bridge, known as the White Bridge. This was replaced by the Inglis Bridge in 1931, with the latter using the masonry footings of the former.

Description
The bridge is constructed of tubular steel and comprises a  single span with a  deck. It is supported by longitudinal stringers and two spans of lateral bracing. The design is of the Warren truss type. The Inglis bridges were constructed using prefabricated components, allowing for rapid deployment and reuse in combat conditions. The Mark I design comprised steel tubes of differing lengths, which led to errors during assembly. The Mark II model standardised the steel tubes used to a single length. Inglis Bridge is a Grade II listed structure.

Notes

References

Sources

External links
 Cadw report on First World War military activity in South-east Wales

Bridges in Monmouthshire
Bridges completed in the 20th century
Grade II listed bridges in Wales
Grade II listed buildings in Monmouthshire
Buildings and structures in Monmouth, Wales
Pedestrian bridges in Wales